David Alan Smith may refer to:

 David A. Smith (computer scientist) (born 1957), American computer scientist and entrepreneur
 David Alan Smith (actor) (born 1959), American actor and writer